Príbovce is a village and municipality in Martin District in the Žilina Region of northern Slovakia.

History
In historical records the village was first mentioned in 1230.

Geography
The municipality lies at an altitude of 420 metres and covers an area of 5.971 km². It has a population of about 1058 people.

External links
http://www.statistics.sk/mosmis/eng/run.html

Villages and municipalities in Martin District